Dale Hartwell Clayton (born October 23, 1957), a parasitologist and professor of evolution at the University of Utah. Clayton is the taxonomist of Strigiphilus garylarsoni.

Information
Dale Clayton named the new species of feather louse after his favorite cartoonist, Gary Larson. Clayton has been interested in the relationships between parasites and their hosts since he was in high school. He was so intrigued with these relationships that he was able to use the research that he gathered in a high school science fair project in his Ph.D. thesis. The information was on the impact of parasites on avian conditions. He is specifically interested in the factors that allow parasite specificity, specification, co-specification, competition, and adaptive radiation. Thus far, his favorite research has been on birds and their feather-feeding lice.

Career
Dale Clayton teaches the following classes:
 Ecology and Evolution
 Ornithology
 Advanced Field Ornithology
 Grad Core Seminar:  Ecology and Evolution

Education
Dale Clayton has received his education from the following institutions:
 NSF-NATO Postdoc, Oxford University (England), 1990–91
 Ph.D. in Evolutionary Biology, University of Chicago, 1989
 M.S. in Entomology, University of Minnesota, 1983
 B.A. in Biology (Psychology minor), Hartwick College, NY, 1979

Additional Education
 Tropical Ecology (O.T.S.), Universidad de Costa Rica, 1984
 General and Med-Vet Acarology, Ohio State University, 1985

Honors
Dale Clayton has received the following honors:
 Nominee: University of Utah Distinguished Innovation & Impact Award, 2011
 Griswold Lecture, Cornell University, 2010
 Nominee: University of Utah Distinguished Teaching Award, 2009
 Henry Baldwin Ward Medalist, American Society of Parasitologists, 2008
 E. Paul Catts Memorial Lecture, Washington State Univ., 2008
 Fellow, American Ornithologists’ Union, 2007
 Secretary, Society for the Study of Evolution, 2006–2008
 Strickland Memorial Lecture, Univ. Alberta, 2004
 NSF-CAREER Award, 1997
 Elective Member, American Ornithologists' Union, 1996
 NSF-NATO Postdoctoral Fellowship – Oxford University, 1990
 American Ornithologists’ Union Council Award, 1988

References

21st-century American zoologists
University of Utah alumni
Living people
1957 births